Pravda Severa (Truth of the North) is a Russian Arkhangelsk-based newspaper, published since 1917. It is issued three times a week on Tuesday, Wednesday and Saturday in the A3 format. The Wednesday circulation is 20,050 copies, with 7,000—8,000 copies on Tuesday and Saturday.

Notes

Russian-language newspapers published in Russia
1917 establishments in Russia
Arkhangelsk
Publications established in 1917